Rowland Brotherhood (18 November 1841 – before 1938) was an English cricketer and civil engineer.  Brotherhood was a left-handed batsman who bowled left-arm underarm fast.  One of 14 children of the engineer Rowland Brotherhood and his wife Priscilla, he was born in Brinkworth, Wiltshire; his date and place of death are unknown.

He made his first-class debut for Gloucestershire against Sussex in 1875.  He made 2 further first-class appearances, both in 1875, against Yorkshire and Nottinghamshire.  In his 3 matches, he took 2 wickets at an average of 33.50, with best figures of 2/49.

From 1877 to 1879 Brotherhood was assisted by his father in sinking shafts for the Severn Tunnel. He practised as a consulting civil engineer with offices in Victoria Street, Westminster, alongside many other consulting engineers, but in 1892, his office was put into receivership. His death is not recorded, but his younger brother John died in 1938 and the notice of his death in The Times indicates that he was the last surviving son of Rowland Brotherhood, senior.

References

External links
Rowland Brotherhood at ESPNcricinfo
Rowland Brotherhood at CricketArchive

1841 births
Year of death unknown
People from Wiltshire
English cricketers
Gloucestershire cricketers
19th-century British engineers